The Regionalist League of the Balearic Islands (EV–CEC) was a Balearic regionalist political party founded in February 2011 from members of the People's Party (PP) and merged into Proposta per les Illes in November 2012.

References

Centrist parties in Spain
Political parties in the Balearic Islands
Liberal parties in Spain
Regionalist parties in Spain